Damiano is a surname with Greek and Italian roots.

People surnamed Damiano include:
Angelo Damiano (b. 1938), Italian racing cyclist and olympic champion
Cesare Damiano (b. 1948), Italian politician 
Christian Damiano (b. 1950), French football coach 
Diane Damiano, American biomedical scientist and physical therapist  
Gerard Damiano (1928–2008), American director of pornographic films
Luca Damiano (b. 1946), Italian film director
Pedro Damiano (1480–1544), Portuguese chess player for whom the opening moves called Damiano Defense is named
Jennifer Damiano (b. 1991), American actress and singer

Fictional people:
Dante Damiano, fictional characters on the American soap The Bold and the Beautiful
Dino Damiano, son of Dante Damiano

See also
Damiano (given name)
Damiano (disambiguation)